Cross Road is the first official greatest hits album by American rock band Bon Jovi, released on October 11, 1994, by Mercury Records. The album contains hits from all previously released albums from their debut, Bon Jovi (1984) to Keep the Faith (1992). The album also features two new tracks: the hit singles "Always" and "Someday I'll Be Saturday Night", as well as a new, updated rendition of "Livin' on a Prayer" entitled "Prayer '94" available only on the North American versions.

"Runaway" was never recorded with the current band, though at that time there were plans to put a "Runaway '94" on the album but it was never recorded. The diner located on the cover of the album is the Roadside Diner in Wall Township, NJ, near the crossroads of Route 33 and Route 34.

The album's first single "Always" went top five in many countries. It spent six months in the top ten of the Billboard Hot 100 and became Bon Jovi's biggest selling single in the United States. Its international success helped the album to peak at number one in 13 countries and made it Polygram Records' best-selling album of 1994. It is Bon Jovi's best selling album in many countries, and continues to sell well. It has sold over 21.5 million copies worldwide, making it one of the best-selling albums of all time.

In 2005, Cross Road was re-issued as a 3-disc box set under the name "Deluxe Sound & Vision", which included the original remastered album, a bonus CD containing B-sides, rarities and fan favourites, and the Live from London DVD. The original remastered album was released in 1998. A video, also entitled Cross Road, was simultaneously released, containing 16 of the band's music videos.

Release and reception 
In the United States, the album debuted and peaked at number 8 on the Billboard 200 the week of November 5, 1994, with 84,000 copies sold, the next week it dropped to number 13 and remained on the chart for fifty seven weeks.  It was certified four times platinum by the RIAA on October 15, 1998, denoting shipments of four millions. According to Nielsen SoundScan, the album has sold 4,951,000 copies in the US as of September 2011, including 324,000 copies sold in 2006.

In the United Kingdom, Cross Road debuted at number one on the UK Albums Chart and spent a total of five non-consecutive weeks atop the chart, later becoming the best-selling album of 1994. The album was certified six times platinum by the BPI. 
The album topped the charts in several other European countries, including Austria, Denmark, Germany, Italy, Portugal and Switzerland. In 2007, it was also certified octuple platinum by the International Federation of the Phonographic Industry for selling 8 million copies across Europe.

The album became Bon Jovi's first number-one set in Japan, where it has sold more than 1.1 million copies. It spent two weeks at number one in Australia and in 2022 it was certified thirteen-times platinum by the Australian Recording Industry Association for shipments exceeding 910,000 copies. The album also debuted at number three on the New Zealand Albums Chart, peaking at number one in its second week and later being certified sectuple platinum by the Recording Industry Association of New Zealand.

The album itself won Metal Edge magazine's 1994 Readers' Choice Awards for "Album of the Year" and "Best Hits or Compilation Album". Its namesake home video was voted "Best Video Cassette," and the single "Always" was voted "Song of the Year" and "Best Video Clip".

Track listing 

The song "Good Guys Don't Always Wear White" is featured in the movie The Cowboy Way. Although Bon Jovi also released a music video to the song it was never released as a single.

Personnel
Credits adapted from Cross Roads liner notes.Bon JoviJon Bon Jovi – lead vocals,  acoustic rhythm guitar, additional guitars
Richie Sambora – lead guitars, backing vocals
Alec John Such – bass, backing vocals
David Bryan – keyboards, backing vocals
Tico Torres – drums, percussionAdditional musicians'
Hugh McDonald – bass, backing vocals
 Kenny Aronoff – drums and percussion on "Blaze of Glory"
 Jeff Beck – lead and slide guitars on “Blaze of Glory”
 Peter Berring – background vocals arrangements
 Roy Bittan – keyboards on “Runaway”
 Carole Brooks – background vocals
 Jeanie Brooks – background vocals
 Joanie Bye – background vocals
 Randy Cantor – synth programs
 Lovena Fox – background vocals
 David Grahamme – background vocals on “Runaway”
 Phil Hoffer – background vocals
 Linda Hunt – background vocals
 Michael Kamen – strings orchestration, arrangement and conduction
 Randy Jackson – bass on "Blaze of Glory"
 Frankie La Rocka – drums on “Runaway”
 Cecille Larochelle – background vocals
 Sue Leonard – background vocals
 Tommy Mandel – synthesizers
 Myna Matthews – background vocals
 Guoudin Morris – percussion
 Aldo Nova – electric guitars, acoustic guitars, keyboards
 Tim Pierce – guitar on “Runaway”
 Jim Salamone – lynn programs
 Mick Seeley – background vocals on “Runaway”
 Joanie Taylor – background vocals
 Benmont Tench – organ on "Blaze of Glory"
 Rick Valenti – background vocals
 Oren Waters – background vocals 
 Julia Waters – background vocals
 Maxine Waters – background vocals
 John Webster – keyboards
Production credits
 Bruce Fairbairn – producer
 Bob Rock – engineer, mixing, producer
 Tim Crich – assistant
 Randy Staub – engineer, mixing
 Obie O'Brien – engineer, additional recording
 Peter Collins – producer
 Kevin Shirley – engineer
 Bob Clearmountain – mixing
 Chris Taylor – assistant
 Danny Kortchmar – producer
 Jon Bon Jovi – producer
 Rob Jacobs – recording, mixing
 Brian "Mutt" Scheuble – recording, mixing
 Chad Musey – assistant
 Greg Goldman – assistant
 Rick Plank – assistant
 Richie Sambora – producer
 Lance Quinn – producer
 David Theoner – mixing
 Fernando Kral – assistant
 Larry Alexander – engineer
 Mal – engineer
 Bill Scheniman – engineer
 John Cianci – assistant
 Big Al Greaves – assistant
 Tony Bongiovi – producer
 Arthur Mann – executive producer
 Scott Litt – engineer
 Jeff Henderickson – engineer
 John Babich – assistant
 Gary Rindfuss – assistant
 Bruce Lampcov – assistant
 Dave Greenberg – assistant
 Barry Bongiovi – assistant
 George Marino – mastering
 Dave Collins – mastering
 Greg Calbi – mastering
 John Kalodner – A&R co-ordination
 Anton Corbijn – photography
 Mark Wiess – additional photography
 Margery Greenspan – art direction
 Lili Picou – design

Charts

Weekly charts

Year-end charts

Decade-end charts

Certifications and sales

See also 
 Cross Road (videos)
 List of best-selling albums in Australia
 List of best-selling albums
 List of diamond-certified albums in Canada

References 

1994 greatest hits albums
Albums produced by Bruce Fairbairn
Albums produced by Bob Rock
Albums produced by Richie Sambora
Bon Jovi compilation albums